Adriano Ferreira Cintra (born 21 May 1974) is a Brazilian multi-instrumentalist and producer, also known as an underground and club celebrity in his hometown. He was a guitarist and singer for the garage rock power trio Thee Butchers' Orchestra, and among his many projects and bands are Ultrasom and Caxabaxa. He was also in the band I Love Miami in his native São Paulo. Openly gay, Cintra is also a composer for fashion shows, and was the recording engineer for Tom Zé's 1998 album Com Defeito de Fabricação.

Cansei de Ser Sexy
His most famous band was the indie-electro project Cansei de Ser Sexy. In 2003, Adriano formed the group with some friends as a joke. He wrote many of their songs, played the drums and produced the band, besides eventually playing bass, guitar and singing. Cansei de Ser Sexy was signed to indie label Sub Pop in the beginning of 2006 to release their first international album, and have toured the United Kingdom, the United States, and Canada extensively, opening for acts including Ladytron, Klaxons, Gwen Stefani and playing on the "Mojave" stage at Coachella 2007. They also headlined the Park Stage of the Glastonbury Festival of 2008.

On November 11, 2011, Cintra reported leaving the band due to disagreements with other band members. Cintra has even insinuated that other members were not so good musicians. CSS was not seriously deterred by Cintra's departure, playing the SOS Festival in Murcia, Spain on April 8, 2012 and the Ballroom Marfa 2012 Benefit Weekend in Marfa, Texas on May 27, 2012, performing several of their old songs.

In April, 2012, several tracks were released from Madrid, Cintra's latest musical project.

References

External links
CSS OFFICIAL PAGE
CSS on MySpace
Caxabaxa on MySpace
Ultrasom on MySpace
Thee Butchers' Orchestra on MySpace

1974 births
Living people
Brazilian people of Portuguese descent
Brazilian people of indigenous peoples descent
Brazilian bass guitarists
Male bass guitarists
Brazilian drummers
Brazilian guitarists
Brazilian record producers
21st-century Brazilian male singers
LGBT record producers
Gay singers
Brazilian gay musicians
Brazilian LGBT singers
Musicians from São Paulo
CSS (band) members
21st-century drummers
21st-century bass guitarists
20th-century Brazilian LGBT people
21st-century Brazilian LGBT people